Zaven Badoyan (born 22 December 1989) is an Armenian football player who currently plays winger for Akzhayik.

Club career
Zaven Badoyan was born in Yerevan. He is a graduate of the local school FIMA. But he first tried his hand at several other sports, and eventually decided to pursue a football career. At 6 years of age he went to football school FIMA, where his first coach was Levon Barseghyan. At 16 years old, he was playing in the professional Armenian Premier League. In 2006, he signed a contract with Kilikia Yerevan advocated by over two seasons. In 2008, while serving in the Army, he played for Gandzasar Kapan, which came in third place at the 2008 Armenian Premier League and was the first medal of Badoyan's career. In January 2010, was meeting with Impuls Dilijan, which subsequently entered into a contract. Badoyan become a major player in the team after spending 27 games out of a possible 28, the same number achieved by Arthur Petrosyan and Avetik Kirakosyan (captain). In December 2011, Badoyan made a 4-year contract with the Belarusian club BATE Borisov. With Badoyan as a member, the club has won the 2012 Belarusian Premier League and 2013 Belarusian Super Cup.

International career
In late April 2010, he was summoned to the youth Armenia U-21 national team of Armenia, and on 20 May of the same year he made his debut in the junior youth team against Estonia.

In 2011, Badoyan had come to the attention of the coaching staff of the Armenia national football team. It was because of his progression in Impuls Dilijan. Before the game in St. Petersburg, head coach Vardan Minasyan included Badoyan in his list for the upcoming match against Russia. However, Badoyan was not chosen for this game day to play. Badoyan's debut took place on 10 August in a game against the Lithuania. In May 2016, Badoyan scored his first international goal, the seventh in a 7-1 friendly win against Guatemala.

International goals
As of match played 28 May 2016. Armenia score listed first, score column indicates score after each Badoyan goal.

Personal life
His favourite championship is La Liga, favourite club is Barcelona, favourite player is Lionel Messi and favourite coach is Pep Guardiola.

Honours

Club
Gandzasar Kapan
Armenian Premier League 3rd place (1): 2008

BATE Borisov
Belarusian Premier League (1): 2012, 2013
Belarusian Super Cup (1): 2013
Belarusian Super Cup Runner-up (1): 2012

References

External links
 
 ffa.am
 
 
 fcbate.by
 armfootball.tripod.com

1989 births
Living people
Footballers from Yerevan
Armenian footballers
Association football midfielders
Armenian expatriate footballers
Expatriate footballers in Belarus
Expatriate footballers in Lebanon
Expatriate footballers in Kazakhstan
Armenian expatriate sportspeople in Belarus
Armenian expatriate sportspeople in Lebanon
Armenia international footballers
Armenia under-21 international footballers
Armenian Premier League players
Belarusian Premier League players
FC Gandzasar Kapan players
FC Impuls Dilijan players
FC BATE Borisov players
FC Gomel players
FC Pyunik players
FC Urartu players
FC Alashkert players
Shabab Al Sahel FC players
FC Ararat Yerevan players
FC Van players
FC Akzhayik players